This is a list of villages of the Poltava Oblast (province) of central Ukraine.

Chornukhynskyi Raion (Чорнухинський район)

 Bogodarivka
 Chornukhy

Chutivskyi Raion (Чутівський район)

 Artemivka
 Chutove

Dykanskyi Raion (Диканський район)

 Bayrak
 Dykanka

Hadyatskyi Raion (Гадяцький район)
 
 Berezova Luka

Hrebinkivskyi Raion (Гребінківський район)

 Beresivka
 Hryhorivka
 Korniyivka
 Korovayi 
 Kulashyntsi
 Mayorstchyna
 Maryanivka
 Natalivka 
 Ovsyuky 
 Oleksandrivka
 Oleksiyivka
 Rudka 
 Serbynivka 
 Slobodo-Petrivka 
 Sliporid-Ivanivka
 Stukalivka 
 Tarasivka 
 Ulyanovka

Kobeliatskyi Raion (Кобеляцький район)

 Brodschyna 
 Butenky 
 Vasylivka 
 Vilhuvatka 
 Hryhoro-Bryhadyrivka 
 Dashyvka
 Dryshyna Hreblya
 Zhuky 
 Zolotarivka 
 Ivanivka 
 Kanavy 
 Kirove 
 Komendantivka
 Krasne 
 Kunivka 
 Luchky 
 Markivka
 Ozera 
 Orlyk 
 Pidhora 
 Radyanske 
 Svitlohirske 
 Suhynivka
 Chervoni Kvity 
 Chorbivka
 Shenhury

Kremenchutskyi Raion (Кременчуцький район)

 Biletskivka 
 Bondari 
 Burty 
 Checheleve 
 Chervona Znam"ianka 
 Chykalivka 
 Demydivka 
 Dzerzhynske 
 Fedorenky 
 Horyslavtsi 
 Hun'ky 
 Kam"iani Potoky 
 Karpivka 
 Keleberda 
 Kindrivka 
 Kobeliachok 
 Korzhivka 
 Kovali 
 Kovalivka 
 Kramarenky 
 Kryvushi 
 Lytvynenky 
 Makhnivka 
 Maksymivka 
 Mala Kokhnivka 
 Malamivka 
 Malyky 
 Mayborodivka 
 Mykhaialenky 
 Mylovydivka 
 Myrne 
 Naidenivka 
 Nedoharky 
 Novoselivka 
 Olefirivka 
 Omelnyk 
 Onyschenky 
 Ostaptsi 
 Paschenivka 
 Panivka 
 Petrashivka 
 Pidhirne 
 Pischane 
 Potoky 
 Pryshyb 
 Pykhal'schina 
 Pysarschyna 
 Pystovity 
 P"iatykhatky 
 Radochynu 
 Revivka 
 Robotivka 
 Roiove 
 Rokytne 
 Rokytne-Donivka 
 Romanky 
 Sadky 
 Salivka 
 Samusiivka 
 Sherbaky 
 Sherbukhy 
 Sosnivka 
 Stara Biletskivka 
 Stepivka 
 Varakytu 
 Vasylenky 
 Vilna Tereshkivka 
 Voskobiinyky 
 Yalyntsi 
 Yaremivka 
 Yerystivka 
 Zapsillia 
 Zaruddia

Lokhvytskyi Raion (Лохвицький район)

 Bezsaly
 Berbenytsi
 Bilohorilka
 Bodakva 
 Vasylky 
 Vyrishalne
 Hyryavi Iskivtsi
 Iskivtsi
 Korsunivka
 Khruli
 Lutsenky
 Luka 
 Pisky
 Poharschtyna
 Ryhy
 Svyrydivka
 Sencha 
 Tokari
 Kharkivtsi 
 Yahnyky

Myrhorodskyi Raion (Миргородський район)

Bakumivka
Bilyky
Velyki Obukhivka
Velyki Bairak
Velyki Sorochyntsi
Verkhnya Budakivka
Harkushyntsi
Hasenky
Dibrivka
Yerky
Zelenyi Kut
Zubriv
Zuivtsi
Kybyntsi
Klyushnykivka
Komyshnya
Maltsi
Mali Sorochyntsi
Ostapivka
Panasivka
Petrivtsi
Polyvyane
Popivka
Romodan
Savyntsi
Slobidka
Solontsi
Khomutets
Cherevky
Cherkaschany
Sharkivschyna
Shakhvorostivka
Shulhy
Yarmaky

Shyshaky Raion (Шишацький район)

 Baranivka

Poltava